Petar Marić (born November 2, 1987) is a Croatian professional basketball player for Jazine of the Croatian second-tier Prva muška liga. Standing at  1.96 m, he plays at the shooting guard position.

Biography 

Marić played for the youth selections for his hometown club Zadar. He signed his first professional contract with another club from Zadar, Voštarnica. Since 2010 he plays in the Croatian top-tier A-1 Liga. He spent the longest period, altogether four seasons in two stints,  in Zabok, a team he also captained.

After a very good season in Kvarner 2010 in Summer 2016 he was signed by Croatian power-house Cibona where he spent one season.

After spending another season in Zabok, in July 2018 he signed a one-year contract with Zadar.

In September 2019, Marić renewed his contract with Zadar by one more year. In December, 2019, his contract with Zadar was terminated and Marić moved back to Sonik-Puntamika. Marić averaged 12.7 points, 3.3 rebounds, 3.1 assists and 1.3 steals per game. On 1 October 2020, he rejoined Zabok.

References

External links
 ABA League Profile
 eurobasket.com Profile

1987 births
Living people
ABA League players
Croatian men's basketball players
KK Zadar players
KK Zagreb players
KK Cibona players
Basketball players from Zadar
KK Zabok players
Shooting guards
KK Kvarner 2010 players
KK Borik Puntamika players
KK Jazine Arbanasi players